Rason (formerly Rajin-Sŏnbong) is a North Korean special city and ice-free port in the Sea of Japan in the North Pacific Ocean on the northeast tip of North Korea. It is in the Kwanbuk region and location of the Rason Special Economic Zone.

In South Korean pronunciation, the initial "R" of the name is pronounced as "N", (나선, Naseon) as per standard Korean phonology. In 2000, the name was shortened from "Rajin-Sŏnbong" to "Rason". During the 1930s, the Japanese called it Rashin; at that time, it was an important port at the end of a railroad line. It was liberated by the Red Army on 14 August 1945.

Before 1991, Rason was used by the Soviet Union as an alternative warm-water port in case Vladivostok was unavailable. The Soviet naval facilities were built starting in 1979. From 1993 to 2004, it was administered separately from North Hamgyŏng as the directly governed city (Chikhalsi) of Rason. Prior to 1993 and from 2004 to 2009, the city had been part of the North Hamgyŏng Province. Since 2010, the city is a "special city", again breaking from provincial control, but different from its older designation as a directly governed city. What this means in practice is unclear.

Rason borders Hunchun county in Jilin province of China and Khasansky District in Primorsky Krai of Russia. China is making investments in the port as it gives it access to the Sea of Japan. In July 2011, the Democratic People's Republic of Korea (DPRK) gave a green light for China's domestic trade cargo to be shipped via its port of Rajin from northeast to east China. Coal is shipped from nearby Chinese mines to Shanghai. A casino by the sea caters to Chinese visitors.

Climate
Rason has a humid continental climate (Köppen climate classification: Dwb).

Administrative divisions
Rason is divided into one district (kuyŏk) and one county (kun).

Rajin-guyŏk (라진구역; 羅津區域)
 Anhwa-dong (안화동/安和洞)
 Anju-dong (안주동/安住洞)
 Jigyŏng-dong (지경동/地境洞)
 Junghyŏn-dong (중현동/中峴洞)
 Changphyŏng-dong (창평동/倉坪洞)
 Chŏnggye-dong (청계동/淸溪洞)
 Hahyŏn-dong (하현동/下峴洞)
 Haebang-dong (해방동/解放洞)
 Kwangok-dong (관곡동/寬谷洞)
 Namsan-dong (남산동/南山洞)
 Tongmyŏng-dong (동명동/東明洞)
 Sanghyŏn-dong (상현동/上峴洞)
 Sinan-dong (신안동/新安洞)
 Sinhae-dong (신해동/新海洞)
 Sinhŭng-dong (신흥동/新興洞)
 Songphyŏng-dong (송평동/松坪洞)
 Yŏkchŏn-dong (역전동/驛前洞)
 Yuhyŏn-dong (유현동/踰峴洞)
 Muchang-ri (무창리/武倉里)
 Huchang-ri (후창리/厚倉里)

Sŏnbong-gun (선봉군; 先鋒郡)
 Sŏnbong-ŭp (선봉읍/先鋒邑)
 Tuman'gang-rodongjagu (두만강로동자구/豆滿江勞動者區)
 Ungsang-rodongjagu (웅상로동자구/雄尙勞動者區)
 Chosal-li (조산리/造山里)
 Hahoe-ri (하회리/下檜里)
 Hayŏp'yŏng-ri (하여평리/下汝坪里)
 Hongŭi-ri (홍의리/洪儀里)
 Kulp'o-ri (굴포리/屈浦里)
 Paekhang-ri (백학리/白鶴里)
 Pup'o-ri (부포리/鮒浦里)
 Sahoe-ri (사회리/四會里)
 Uam-ri (우암리/牛岩里)
 Wŏnjŏng-ri (원정리/元汀里)

Port
The Korean People's Navy maintains a naval training base at the Rajin Port in the city of Rason. In addition, a Chinese company in 2017 leased a dock for 10 years at the port.

Economy

Foreign Investments
The Rason Emperor Hotel and Casino is a resort and casino in Rason owned by the Emperor Group, a diversified Hong Kong based commercial group.

Oil Refinery
Rajin Oil Refinery is the largest oil refinery in North Korea. Although North Korea itself lacks oil wells, they can and do import oil from other countries to supply their refineries. Large oil tankers are spotted multiple times unloading at the Rajin port.

Mining
Rason is found to have a rich mineral storage, minerals such as coal, iron, magnesite, and clay are plentiful.

Ship building
Rason is home to No 28 Shipyard Najin, a shipbuilder and supplier to the Korean People's Navy.

Transport

Rail
Rajin Station is on the Pyongra Line and Hambuk Line. The Hongui Line was opened in 1959, connecting Rason with the Russian Khasan on the Tumen River; the river is the natural North Korea–Russia border.

Road
The Tumen River Bridge connects between Hunchun and Rason.

Sister cites
 Hunchun, Jilin, Yanbian Korean Autonomous Prefecture, People's Republic of China.

See also

 List of cities in North Korea
 Rajin University of Marine Transport
 Geography of North Korea

References

Further reading
Dormels, Rainer: North Korea's Cities: Industrial facilities, internal structures and typification. Jimoondang, 2014.

External links

360 degree panorama of Rajin Port in Rason
North Korea Uncovered  (North Korea Google Earth) Maps out Rason's economic infrastructure, including railways, hotels, tourist destinations, cultural facilities, ports, electricity grid, and electrified perimeter fence on Google Earth.
 City profile of Rason 

 
Cities in North Hamgyong
Directly Governed Cities and Special Administrative Regions of North Korea
Port cities and towns in North Korea